The  is a Japanese language daily newspaper published by the . As of 2022, it had a circulation of about 467,000 (total of morning and evening editions). It is headquartered in Fukuoka, which accounts for the bulk of its circulation, and is  also sold throughout Kyūshū.

History 
Nishinippon Shimbun began in 1877 as the Chikushi Shimbun to report the Seinan Civil War. In 1880 it became the Fukuoka Nichi-Nichi Shimbun and then in 1942, during the Pacific War, it joined with Kyushu Hodo to form the Nishinippon Shimbun.

Domestic network 
Nishinippon Shimbun is the largest regional newspaper in Kyushu. Its reporters network covers all of Kyushu. In addition to its main office in Fukuoka City, it has 65 local offices in the 7 prefectures of Kyushu, and has Tokyo and Osaka branches.

Foreign correspondents network 
Nishinippon Shimbun has six foreign bureaus, in Washington, D.C., Paris, Beijing, Taipei, Seoul, and Bangkok. It has also had a writer program with Busan Ilbo in Busan, Korea.

Events and teams sponsored 
In 1950, Nishinippon Shimbun owned the Nishi-Nippon Pirates, a Japanese baseball team and a founding member of Nippon Professional Baseball's Central League. The Pirates only lasted one season before being merged with the Nishitetsu Clippers to form the Nishitetsu Lions.

The Nishinippon Shimbun sponsors the Prince Takamatsu Cup Nishinippon Round-Kyūshū Ekiden(Grand Tour Kyushu), the world's longest relay race.

References

Further reading

External links
Official site (Japanese)

1877 establishments in Japan
Daily newspapers published in Japan
Japanese-language newspapers
Mass media in Fukuoka
Newspapers established in 1877